Market Place is a public square in the English market town of Poulton-le-Fylde, Lancashire. Dating to the Middle Ages, it has historically been a site of weekly markets, today taking place on Mondays (except Bank Holiday Monday). It is now mostly used as a shopping precinct, along with the adjacent indoor Teanlowe Centre.

It is bounded by the pedestrianised Church Street to the north and Blackpool Old Road (formerly Bull Street) to the south. A Grade II* listed church, St Chad's, stands beyond the square's northeastern corner, while in the square's centre is the town's war memorial. At its southern end is (in line, from north to south) the whipping post, fish stones, market cross and stocks (each Grade II listed).

Other notable buildings and structures in Market Place include (clockwise from the north) 2 Market Place (the former custom house), a K6 telephone box, 25–31 Market Place (featuring the arms of Alexander Rigby, who built the precursor to today's terrace in 1693) and Old Town Hall. All except Old Town Hall are Grade II listed.

The first municipal building in the town was a building known as the Moot Hall, which stood at the southern end of the square, just in front of the market cross, in late medieval times.

On 5 March 1732, a fire broke out in the square, resulting in the destruction of all of the properties on its western side. Most buildings at this time had thatched roofs, as described by Henry Fishwick in his 1885 book Remains, Historical and Literary, Connected with the Palatine Counties of Lancaster and Chester, Volume 8.

The first purpose-built police station in the town was erected on the eastern side of Market Place in 1895, using the shell of the former home of the Walmsley family. The building was demolished in 1898, and replaced two years later by a Masonic Hall. Poulton Freemasons originally met at the Bull Hotel in Market Place.

A second incarnation of the police station was built at 12–16 Market Place, with a second floor added in 1960.

References 

Poulton-le-Fylde
Squares in England